The River Sorn is a small river on the Scottish island of Islay. Draining Loch Finlaggan and having gathered the waters of the Allt Ruadh and the Ballygrant Burn, it flows southwestwards to enter the sea at the village of Bridgend at the head of Loch Indaal.

References

External links 

Rivers of Argyll and Bute